The 2008 Toyota Grand Prix of Long Beach was the third round of the 2008 IndyCar Series season, for teams who competed in the Champ Car World Series in 2007. This was because the 2008 Indy Japan 300 occurred on the same weekend and there was no way of changing dates to avoid the clash. It was held on April 20, 2008, at the  street circuit in Long Beach, California, United States. The race was historic in that Will Power became the last winner of a Champ Car-style race, and also because it was the last professional race of Roberto Moreno in open-wheel motorsports. The contingent of former Champ Car teams produced a 20-car field, all utilizing the turbocharged Panoz DP01-Cosworth for the final time. All participants entering other IndyCar races earned points towards the 2008 IndyCar Series championship. All the teams raced together again a week later at Kansas Speedway, and for the remainder of the schedule together. The race was run under Champ Car rules, which included the standing start, option tire, two-day qualifying format, ran on time (1 hour, 45 minutes) rather than a set number of laps.  The option tire rule was adopted by the IRL for 2009, as well as standing starts for selected road and street course races in 2013 and 2014 only to be abandoned in 2015 due to safety concerns.

Several IRL staff and team personnel had flown back from Japan Sunday afternoon (local time) and saw at least part of the race, including Motegi winner Danica Patrick, who had scored her historic win the previous evening.

Results

References

Toyota Grand Prix of Long Beach
Toyota Grand Prix of Long Beach
Toyota Grand Prix of Long Beach
2008